The Dutch Eerste Divisie in the 1964–65 season was contested by 16 teams. Willem II won the championship for the second time.

New entrants
Promoted from the 1963–64 Tweede Divisie:
 Alkmaar '54
 NEC
Relegated from the 1963–64 Eredivisie:
 Blauw-Wit Amsterdam
 FC Volendam

League standings

Championship match
Willem II & Elinkwijk played a match to determine the league champions (on the field of BVV).

See also
 1964–65 Eredivisie
 1964–65 Tweede Divisie

References
Netherlands - List of final tables (RSSSF)

Eerste Divisie seasons
2
Neth